Syscia augustae, formerly Cerapachys augustae, is a species of doryline ant in the family Formicidae.

References

Further reading

External links

 

Dorylinae
Articles created by Qbugbot
Insects described in 1902